"Sha La La" is a song written by Robert Mosely (whose name is spelled "Moseley" on the record) and Robert Taylor. The Shirelles released the original version of the song as a single in 1964 which reached #15 on the U.S. R&B chart and #69 on the U.S. pop chart.

Manfred Mann recording
The most successful version was performed by British pop group Manfred Mann.  It reached #3 on the UK Singles Chart and #12 on both the U.S. pop chart and the Canadian chart in 1965.  It was featured on the US version of their 1965 album The Five Faces of Manfred Mann.

Cash Box described it as "a delightful rock-a-rhythmic beat refitting of the Shirelles' few-seasons-back click."

Other versions
The Ventures released a version of the song on their 1964 album Knock Me Out!
Gary Lewis & the Playboys released a version of the song on their 1965 album Everybody Loves a Clown.
Enoch Light and His Light Brigade released a version of the song on their 1967 EP Discotheque Vol. 2.
The Manfreds released a version of the song on their 1999 album L.I.V.E.

References

1964 songs
1964 singles
Manfred Mann songs
The Shirelles songs
The Ventures songs
Gary Lewis & the Playboys songs
Song recordings produced by Snuff Garrett
United Artists Records singles
Scepter Records singles

Songs written by Robert Mosley
Song recordings produced by John Burgess